Carolina Bucci (born October 1976) is an Italian jewellery designer. Born in Florence, Italy, she lives between London and New York City and is the first female to lead her family's jewellery company.

Early life 
Carolina Bucci was born in October 1976, in Florence, Italy.

Career
Bucci is the 4th generation in her family line of jewelers, which began when her great-grandfather, Ferdinando Bucci, opened a workshop in Florence, Italy, specialising in the sale and repair of gentlemen's pocket watches. He eventually began to make bespoke gold chains to accessorize his clients' timepieces, and from there he moved into the production of fine jewellery. His son, Fosco, took over the business in 1920, by which point they had gained success across Italy, and moved the showroom to Piazza Santo Stefano, next to Florence's Ponte Vecchio. After the Second World War, her father grew the business internationally, particularly in the US and Japan, whilst continuing to anchor the manufacture of the jewellery in the family's Florentine workshops.

Design
Following her graduation from FIT where she studied fine arts and jewellery design, Bucci returned to Florence where she launched her first collections: Lucky(a reinvention of the friendship bracelets she made as a child), '‘Woven’', a reinvention of centuries-old Florentine textile looms to weave gold and silk threads. She followed those up with her ‘Florentine Finish’ as seen on Audemars Piguet Royal Oak Frosted Gold watches. Bucci credits her Lucky bracelet's appearance in Sex and the City with launching her career as a designer more broadly.
 
A selection of her designs are in the permanent jewellery collection of the Palazzo Pitti museum in Florence.

2018 also saw the launch of the FORTE beads collection, which debuted in Las Vegas at the Couture Jewelry Show.

In 2019 Bucci released a series of hand blown glasses, made in collaboration with the Murano glass maker Laguna B, as well as hand carved Carrara marble spheres and the application of her Florentine Finish to homeware.

Audemars Piguet
In 2016 she announced a collaboration with Audemars Piguet, to redesign their Royal Oak watch with her Florentine finish to celebrate the watch's 40th anniversary. For her second collaboration with Audemars Piguet, Bucci once again applied her signature Florentine Finish to the Limited Edition Royal Oak, this time in 18k yellow gold, alongside a silver toned mirror dial, in place of the traditional Tapisserie. The 2021 edition is white gold featuring a more masculine dial.

Retail 
In 2007 she established her London flagship store and a second in Porto Montenegro in 2011. In 2018 her London flagship store relocated to 22 Motcomb Street. Carolina Bucci jewellery is available in Harrods, Bergdorf Goodman, Hirsliefers, Luisa Via Roma and other stores, as well as Net A Porter and their on line store Carolinabucci.com.

References

External links

Italian jewellery designers
Living people
1976 births
Fashion Institute of Technology alumni
Businesspeople from Florence